Attilio Nicodemo (born 25 January 1974) is a former Italian footballer who played as a midfielder.

Career
Born in Rome, Lazio region, Nicodemo started his senior career at Serie D side Termoli, located at Molise region. He then played 5 seasons at Serie C1, for Nola, then Juve Stabia and Foggia. He followed Foggia relegated to Serie C2 in 1999. In 2000, he was bought by Roma along with Giuseppe Di Masi and Franco Brienza, and joined sister club Palermo in co-ownership deal along with Luca Ferri, for 300 million Italian lire. Brienza and Roma player Daniele De Vezze also joined the Sicily side on loan. He then loaned to French Ligue 2 side Nice, where he played 17 times. In June 2001, Palermo acquired the remained 50% registration rights for 5 billion lire. In 2001–02 season, he was loaned to Chieti. In August 2002, after Roma's president Franco Sensi sold Palermo to Maurizio Zamparini, Nicodemo and Riccardo Rimondini joined Roma.

He went to Florence for newly re-found Florentia Viola, along with Roma's Raffaele Longo, Luigi Panarelli and Antonio Rizzo.

In 2003–04 season, he was loaned to Serie C1 side Teramo. In mid season he deal became permanent. In summer 2006, he joined Serie C2 side Portogruaro. In July 2007 for Serie C1 side Sorrento.

References

External links

 Profile at AIC.Football.it 
 

Italian footballers
Italian expatriate footballers
Ligue 2 players
Serie C players
S.S. Juve Stabia players
Calcio Foggia 1920 players
OGC Nice players
S.S. Chieti Calcio players
ACF Fiorentina players
S.S. Teramo Calcio players
A.S.D. Sorrento players
Expatriate footballers in France
Association football midfielders
Footballers from Rome
1974 births
Living people
A.S.D. Termoli Calcio 1920 players